Harkusha or Garkusha (Cyrillic: Гаркуша) is a gender-neutral Slavic surname that may refer to
Diana Harkusha (born 1994), Ukrainian lawyer and actress
Roman Harkusha (born 1984), Belarusian football player

Ukrainian-language surnames
Belarusian-language surnames